RS Persei is a red supergiant variable star located in the Double Cluster in Perseus. The star's apparent magnitude varies from 7.82 to 10.0, meaning it is never visible to the naked eye.

Location
RS Persei is a member of the cluster NGC 884, χ Persei, one half of the famous Double Cluster.

Variability

RS Persei is classified as a semiregular variable star, with its brightness varying from magnitude 7.82 to 10.0 over 245 days, Detailed studies show that it also pulsates with a long secondary period of  days.

Properties
RS Persei is a large cool star with a temperature of 3,500 K. This makes it luminous, although much of its radiation is emitted in the infrared. More recently, 2014 calculations across all wavelengths gives the star a lower luminosity of  based on an assumed distance, and a radius of  based on the measured angular diameter and luminosity. 

It is surrounded by dust that has condensed from material lost by the star.

RS Persei has sometimes been considered to be a highly evolved low mass Asymptotic Giant Branch (AGB) star, but calculations of its current mass suggest that it is a low mass supergiant.  NGC 244 is also too young to host AGB stars.

References

External links
 Light curve
 VSX entry

M-type supergiants
Perseus (constellation)
Persei, RS
014488
BD+56 583
Semiregular variable stars
J02222428+5706340